Jan Karol Dowgiałło Zawisza (1597 – 9 March 1661) was a Polish clergyman and bishop for the Roman Catholic Diocese of Vilnius. He became ordained in 1657. He was appointed bishop in 1656. He died on 9 March 1661.

References

1597 births
1661 deaths
17th-century Roman Catholic bishops in the Polish–Lithuanian Commonwealth